Solomoni 'Junior' Rasolea (born 29 April 1991) is an Australian rugby union footballer. His regular playing position is centre. He currently plays for French outfit Grenoble. He is a former Australia sevens international.

Rasolea was educated at the Anglican Church Grammar School in Brisbane the same high school as Wallaby flanker David Pocock and flyhalf Quade Cooper.

Rasolea played in the centres for  Fiji during his second IRB Junior World Championship in 2011, and also for the  Queensland Under 16s (2007), the Queensland Schoolboys (2008–09) and the University club in Brisbane.

In March 2016, he joined Pro14 side Edinburgh. On 8 March 2018, Rasolea would join with French club Grenoble in the Pro D2 from the 2018-19 season.

Super Rugby statistics

References 

1991 births
Australian rugby union players
Australian people of I-Taukei Fijian descent
Western Force players
Rugby union centres
People from Brisbane
Living people
Male rugby sevens players
People educated at Anglican Church Grammar School
Perth Spirit players